COVID czar may refer to:

COVID czar, head of Israel Shield, the Israeli COVID-19 program
White House COVID-19 Response Coordinator, head of the White House COVID-19 Response Team, nicknamed COVID-19 Czar

See also
Czar (political term)
National responses to the COVID-19 pandemic